The Granite School District spreads across central Salt Lake County, Utah, serving West Valley City, Millcreek, Taylorsville, South Salt Lake, and Holladay; Kearns and Magna Townships; and parts of West Jordan, Murray and Cottonwood Heights. About 67,000 students are enrolled in its programs ranging from kindergarten to twelfth grade. It operates 9 high schools, 15 junior high schools, 62 elementary schools, as well as several specialty schools. This makes Granite the third largest school district in the state of Utah behind Alpine School District in Utah County and Davis County School District. Other school districts in the area include the Salt Lake City School District and the Murray School District.

All the following information is from the Granite School District website

High schools
Cottonwood, Murray
Academy for Math, Engineering, and Science (Charter School attached to Cottonwood High School)
Cyprus, Magna
Cyprus Brockbank Campus
Granger, West Valley City
Connection (formerly Granite Peaks; alternative school), South Salt Lake. Multiple campuses:
Cottonwood Campus, Granger Campus, Granite Education Center Campus, Hunter Campus, Kearns Campus, Skyline Campus, Taylorsville Campus
Hunter, West Valley City
Kearns, Kearns
Olympus, Holladay
Skyline, Millcreek
Taylorsville, Taylorsville

Former
Granite, South Salt Lake (closed in 2009)

Junior high schools

Bennion, Taylorsville
Bonneville, Holladay
Churchill, Millcreek
Eisenhower, Taylorsville
Evergreen, Millcreek
Granite Park, South Salt Lake
Hunter, West Valley City
Jefferson, Thomas, Kearns
Kearns, Kearns
Kennedy, John F., West Valley City
Matheson, Scott M., Magna
Olympus, Holladay
Valley, West Valley City
Wasatch, Millcreek
West Lake, West Valley City. West Lake Junior High has been relocated to the Westbrook Elementary school (which was closed in 2019) due to damages from the March 18, 2020 earthquake.

Former
Brockbank, Magna (closed as a junior high school in 2016, campus is now the Brockbank Campus of Cyprus High School)

Elementary schools

Academy Park, West Valley City
Arcadia, Taylorsville
Armstrong Academy, West Valley City
Bacchus, Thomas W., Kearns
Beehive, Kearns
Bennion, Taylorsville
Bridger, Jim., West Jordan
Copper Hills, Magna
Cottonwood, Holladay
Crestview, Holladay
Diamond Ridge, West Valley City
Driggs, Howard R., Holladay
Eastwood, Millcreek
Elk Run, Magna
Farnsworth, Philo T., West Valley City
Fox Hills, Taylorsville
Fremont, John C., Taylorsville
Frost, Robert, West Valley City
Gourley, David, Kearns
Granger, West Valley City
Hillsdale, West Valley City
Hillside, West Valley City
Holladay, Holladay (closed in 2002)
Hunter, West Valley City
Jackling, West Valley City
Lake Ridge, Magna
Lincoln, South Salt Lake
Magna, Magna
Mill Creek, Millcreek
Monroe, West Valley City
Morningside, Millcreek
Moss, James E., Millcreek
Oakridge, Millcreek
Oakwood, Holladay
Orchard, Douglas T., West Valley City
Penn, William, Millcreek
Pioneer, West Valley City
Pleasant Green, Magna
Plymouth, Taylorsville
Redwood, West Valley City
Rolling Meadows, West Valley City
Rosecrest, Millcreek Township
Silver Hills, West Valley City
Smith, Calvin, Taylorsville
South Kearns, Kearns
Spring Lane, Holladay
Stansbury, West Valley City
Taylorsville, Taylorsville
Truman, Harry S., West Valley City
Twin Peaks, Murray
Upland Terrace, Millcreek
Valley Crest, West Valley City
Vista, Taylorsville
Walker, Olene, Salt Lake City
Western Hills, Kearns
West Kearns, Kearns
West Valley, West Valley City
Whittier, West Valley City
Wilson, Woodrow, South Salt Lake
Woodstock, Murray
Wright, Gearld L., West Valley City

Former 

 Sandburg, Carl, West Valley City (closed in 2018) 
Oquirrh Hills, Kearns (closed in 2019) 
Westbrook, Taylorsville (closed in 2019)

Specialty Schools and Programs
Granite Peaks, Salt Lake City
Granite Technical Institute (GTI), Salt Lake City
Hartvigsen, Taylorsville, Utah
Granite Transition Services, Salt Lake City
YESS Program, Salt Lake City
Granite Alternative Placement Program (GAPP), Holladay, Utah
Preschool

History
The district was created in 1904 with 4,258 students. Its name and original boundaries were taken from the Granite Stake of the LDS Church, which at the time spanned nearly the entire breadth of the Salt Lake Valley from Mill Creek in the east to Hunter in the west, and from roughly Sugar House in the north to Bennion in the south.

References

External links

Granite School District 

School districts in Utah
Education in Salt Lake County, Utah